Koca Yusuf Pasha was an Ottoman statesman. He was grand vizier from 25 January 1786 to 28 May 1789 (during reign of Abdul Hamid I), and Kapudan Pasha (Grand Admiral of the Ottoman Navy) after 19 December 1789. He became grand vizier again, this time serving from 12 February 1791 until mid-1792 (during reign of Selim III). 

He was a Georgian convert to Islam and also served as the governor of the Peloponnese.

See also
List of Ottoman Grand Viziers

References

18th-century Grand Viziers of the Ottoman Empire
Muslims from Georgia (country)
Pashas
Georgians from the Ottoman Empire
Kapudan Pashas
Governors of the Ottoman Empire